Indian Island is an island in Dusky Sound in Fiordland.  Its name stems from first sightings of indigenous people on the island by James Cook in 1773.

The island is situated southeast of Anchor Island and west of Long Island, and is part of Fiordland National Park.

Pest control of introduced animal species such as stoats and rats from 1999 onwards led to the island to be declared pest-free in 2012.  The island is one of only nine completely pest-free islands in Fiordland and provides another buffer to Anchor Island, which is critical to the survival of kakapo.

See also

 List of islands of New Zealand
 List of islands
 Desert island

References

Uninhabited islands of New Zealand
Islands of Fiordland
Fiordland National Park